Mesohippus (Greek: / meaning "middle" and / meaning "horse") is an extinct genus of early horse. It lived 37 to 32 million years ago in the Early Oligocene. Like many fossil horses, Mesohippus was common in North America. Its shoulder height is estimated at about 60 cm.

Description

Mesohippus had longer legs than its predecessor Eohippus and stood about 60 cm (6 hands) tall. This equid is the first fully tridactyl horse in the evolutionary record, with the third digit being longer and larger than its second and fourth digits; Mesohippus had not developed a hoof at this point, rather it still had pads as seen in Hyracotherium and Orohippus. The face of Mesohippus was longer and larger than earlier equids. It had a slight facial fossa, or depression, in the skull. The eyes were rounder, and were set wider apart and farther back than in Hyracotherium. 
 
Unlike earlier horses, its teeth were low crowned and contained a single gap behind the front teeth, where the bit now rests in the modern horse. In addition, it had another grinding tooth, making a total of six. Mesohippus was a browser that fed on tender twigs and fruit. The cerebral hemisphere, or cranial cavity, was notably larger than that of its predecessors; its brain was similar to that of modern horses.

Species

See also

Eohippus
Protohippus

References

Eocene horses
Eocene odd-toed ungulates
Oligocene horses
Rupelian genus extinctions
Transitional fossils
White River Fauna
Prehistoric placental genera
Paleogene mammals of North America
Fossil taxa described in 1875